Pierluigi Zappacosta (born Chieti, Italy, on July 2, 1950) is an Italian businessman and chairman of Faro Ventures. He has co-founded, directed, and served on the boards of several prestigious companies, including Logitech and Sierra Sciences.

Career 
In 1981, he co-founded Logitech (Nasdaq: LOGI) together with Daniel Borel and Giacomo Marini, which went on to become the world's largest manufacturer of computer mice and other personal interface products.  Zappacosta served at Logitech for sixteen years, first as president and CEO and later as vice-chairman. He was instrumental in taking the company public in Switzerland in 1988 and on NASDAQ in 1997, raising over $60 million. By the time Zappacosta left in 1998, sales of Logitech had risen to over $400 million per year.

Zappacosta is also a venture partner with Noventi,  and served as CEO at Sierra Sciences, and chairman at Digital Persona, Inc., a company offering software and hardware for identification based on biometrics. He also sits on the board of trustees of the Reason Foundation and of the Bruno Leoni Institute.

Education 
He received his bachelor's degree (laurea in electrical engineering) from the University of Rome in Italy, graduating cum laude.  He earned his master's degree in computer science from Stanford in 1978.

Personal life 
Zappacosta's son, Marco Zappacosta, is the co-founder and CEO of the unicorn company Thumbtack.

References

1950 births
Living people
People from Chieti
American computer businesspeople
Italian businesspeople
American chief executives of manufacturing companies
Venture capitalists
20th-century American businesspeople